Real Deal is an album by David Murray and Milford Graves released on the Japanese DIW label in 1994. It features eight duo performances by Murray and Graves.

Reception
The Allmusic review awarded the album 3 stars.

Track listing
 "Stated With Peace" (Murray) - 7:50  
 "The Third Day" (Murray) - 8:50  
 "Luxor" (Murray) -  8:30  
 "Under & Over" (Graves) - 6:04  
 "Moving About" (Graves) - 11:09  
 "Ultimate High Priest" (Graves) -  6:27  
 "Essential Soul" (Graves) - 10:49  
 "Continuity" (Murray) - 4:10

Personnel
David Murray - tenor saxophone
Milford Graves - drums

References 

1994 albums
David Murray (saxophonist) albums
DIW Records albums